The Lega Basket Serie A (LBA) is a professional men's club basketball league that has been organised in Italy since 1920. Serie A is organised by Lega Basket, which is regulated by the Italian Basketball Federation (FIP). It is the highest-tier level of the Italian league system. The LBA plays under FIBA rules and currently consists of 16 teams, with the lowest-placed team relegated to the Serie A2 and replaced by the winner of the play-offs of that tier.

A total of 99 teams have competed in the LBA since its inception. Seventeen teams have been crowned champions, with Olimpia Milano having won the title a record 28 times, and Virtus Bologna 16 times. According to FIBA Europe's and Euroleague Basketball's national league coefficients, the LBA was the historically top ranked national domestic league in Europe, for the period 1958 to 2007. Today, the LBA is considered to be one of the top European national basketball leagues. Its clubs have won the most EuroLeague championships (13), the most FIBA Saporta Cups (15), and the most FIBA Korać Cups (10).

History

First years
The first men's basketball championship was held in Italy in 1920, organized by the Royal Italian National Gymnastics Federation and won by S.E.F. Costanza Milano, led by Carlo Andreoli. However, the first championship officially organized by the newly formed Italian Basketball Federation (FIP) was instead disputed in 1922. During the first years, Milan's teams dominated the league: in the initial six seasons, there were five successes for Assi Milano and one for Internazionale Milano. Between 1928 and 1935, Ginnastica Roma and Ginnastica Triestina alternatively won the championship.

In 1936, the championship was won by Olimpia Milano; the title was the first of 28 championships won by Olimpia over the decades. The team, coached by Giannino Valli, won four consecutive championships, only interrupted by Trieste in 1939–1940 and 1940–1941. In 1941–42 and 1942–43, the title was won by Reyer Venezia, however, the following two seasons were never held, due to the break out of World War II on Italian soil.

From 1945 to the 1970s

At the end of the war, the league was characterized by the rise of Virtus Bologna, which won four consecutive seasons. Virtus would later become one of the most successful teams in Italy, capable of winning 16 titles through its history. From the 1949–50 season, the domination of Olimpia Milano began. Milan's team was able of winning 14 championships out of the 18 played up to 1966–67. The team, coached by Cesare Rubini, marked an unrepeatable dominance on the Italian league thanks to players like Sandro Gamba, Romeo Romanutti, Enrico Pagani and Bill Bradley. From 1954 to 1956, Virtus won the title again, achieving a so-called back-to-back under the leadership of Vittorio Tracuzzi, while in 1961 and 1964, Pallacanestro Varese was crowned Italian champion. 

After the victory of Pallacanestro Cantù in 1968, Varese opened a new cycle of successes, winning 7 championships in 10 years, between 1968–69 and 1977–78. The team, led by Aldo Ossola, Dino Meneghin, Bob Morse, Manuel Raga and coached by Aza Nikolić, was widely considered one of the best in the history of Italian basketball, capable of winning five European titles during the same period. Olimpia Milano and Cantù respectively won the championship in 1972 and 1975, while Virtus won the title in 1976, coached by Dan Peterson, and achieved a back-to-back in 1978–79 and 1979–80, thanks to Krešimir Ćosić, one of the best centers in Europe, Renato Villalta, Carlo Caglieris and the captain Gianni Bertolotti.

The Golden Age of 1980s and 1990s
The 1980s and the 1990s are widely considered as the "golden age" of Italian basketball; during these decades, the Italian championship became one of the most competitive in the world, often considered to be the second one after NBA. The 1980s were characterized by a predominance of Olimpia Milano. The so-called "red shoes" were capable of winning five titles between 1981 and 1989, thanks to outstanding players like Mike D'Antoni, Bob McAdoo and Dino Meneghin. Cantù won its third title in 1981, while Virtus Roma won its first and only championship in 1983, under the leadership of the American point guard Larry Wright. In the 1983–84 season, Virtus Bologna won its tenth national title, defeating Olimpia Milano in the finals, while Victoria Libertas Pesaro was crowned Italian champion twice in 1988 and 1990.

The 1990s began with the historic success of Nando Gentile and Vincenzo Esposito's Phonola Caserta; as of today, this title is still the only one won by a team from Southern Italy. While the 1991–92 season was won by Toni Kukoč's Benetton Treviso. However, the 1990s were deeply marked by the dominance of Virtus Bologna: the "Black V" was able of winning four titles from 1992 to 1998, thanks to its Serbian star, Predrag Danilović, but also important players like Antoine Rigaudeau, Alessandro Abbio and Zoran Savić. Treviso won the title again in 1997, while Varese won its tenth national championship in 1999, thanks to young and talented players like Andrea Meneghin and Gianmarco Pozzecco.

The league through the 2000s and 2010s
The 1999–2000 championship was won by Carlton Myers's Fortitudo Bologna, winning for the first time after three consecutive lost finals between 1995–96 and 1997–98. In the following season, Virtus Bologna of Manu Ginóbili was crowned national champion once again. Moreover, the Black V was able of winning both the Italian Cup and the EuroLeague, achieving a so-called Triple Crown (known in Italy as Grande Slam). From 2002 to 2006, the Serie A was marked by a harsh rivalry between Benetton Treviso and Fortitudo Bologna: Treviso won the title in 2002, 2003 and 2006, always defeating Fortitudo in the national finals; Bologna's team won the title in 2005 against Olimpia Milano.

In 2004, Mens Sana Siena won its first title, but it was only three years later, in 2007, that Siena would begun its dominance over the Italian league. From 2007 to 2013, the Tuscan team was able of winning seven consecutive titles, under the leaderships of Terrell McIntyre, Shaun Stonerook and Romain Sato. However, on 7 October 2016, following an investigation for accounting and fiscal fraud, the Court of the Italian Basketball Federation has revoked the championship titles awarded to Siena for the 2011–12 and 2012–13 seasons, two Italian Cups (2012 and 2013) and the 2013 Supercoppa. Following Siena's relegation, Olimpia Milano, under the new ownership of Giorgio Armani, won the championship again in 2014, 2016 and 2018, while Dinamo Sassari won its first title in 2015, becoming the first team from Sardinia to do so. In 2017 and 2019, Reyer Venezia returned to the top of Italian league after more than seven decades.

Recent seasons
The 2019–20 regular season saw a strong prominence of Virtus Bologna, however, the season was cancelled prematurely because of the COVID-19 pandemic and, for the first time since 1945, the Italian league did not assigned the title. In the following season, Miloš Teodosić's Virtus Bologna won its 16th title, defeating 4–0 its historic rival Olimpia Milano in the national finals. It was Virtus's first title after twenty years.

Title sponsorships

From 1993 to 2022, the LBA had title sponsorship rights sold to ten companies; UnipolSal was the most recent title sponsor, having sponsored the LBA from 2020 to the present.

Following the end of the 2015–16 season, LBA has a new sponsor. The Turkish brand Beko left LBA after four years of sponsorship, and all its other basketball team sponshorships in Europe. Beko would focus on their sponsorship of the Spanish football team Barcelona. 

In December 2016, President Egidio Bianchi had communicated to have reached an agreement with PosteMobile to become the title sponsor of the LBA. In July 2019, LBA announced that the agreement with PosteMobile for LBA ended on June 30.

Competition format 

The competition format follows a double round-robin format. During the course of a season, which lasts from October to May, each club plays each other twice (once at home and once away), for a total of 30 games. Teams rankings at season end is determined by receiving two points for a win and no points for a loss. At season end, the eight top teams play-off, pitting the first place standings team against the 8th place team, and so on.

There are three playoff rounds. The Quarterfinals are best of five, while the semifinals and finals series are best of seven (in the 2012–13 season, all series were best-of-seven). The winner of the finals round is the champion of the LBA.

At season's end, the last qualified club of the regular season is relegated to Serie A2 Basket, and replaced by the winner of the playoffs of this league.

Arena rules 
LBA clubs must play in arenas that seat at least 3,500 people. From 2017 to 2018 season, clubs must host their home playoffs matches in arenas that have a seating capacity of at least 5,000 people.

Clubs composition
Each team is allowed either five or seven foreign players under two formulas:
5 foreigners from countries outside the European Union
3 foreigners from countries outside the E.U., 4 foreigners from E.U. countries (also including those from countries signatory of the Cotonou Agreement)

Each club can choose the 5+5 formula, that consists of five Italian players and five foreign players, and the 3+4+5 formula, with five Italian players, three foreigners from countries outside the E.U. and four foreigners from E.U. countries or "Cotonou Countries".

At the end of the season there is a prize of €500,000 for the top three ranked teams, that had chosen the 5+5 formula, considering the playing time of Italian players, and €200,000 for those teams that will obtain the best results with their youth sector.

Qualifying for European competitions
In summer 2016, four Italian teams (Reggio Emilia, Trento, Sassari and Cantù) were forced to withdraw from EuroCup because of the FIBA and Euroleague Basketball controversy.

From 2017 to 2018 season, Italian Basketball Federation would allow LBA clubs to rejoin EuroCup. There will be at least six teams in Europe. One in EuroLeague (Olimpia Milano directly enter the EuroLeague as licensed club), two in EuroCup (but they are negotiating with ECA for a third spot) and three in Basketball Champions League. Lega Basket decided Italian Clubs will be free to choose in which European Cup they want to play, based on final ranking and sports merit.

Media 
For the 2017–18, 2018–19 and 2019–20 seasons, domestic TV rights are shared by Rai Sport and Eurosport. The new frame shows Rai airing one game every Sunday on free TV, while Eurosport is the new owner of the pay TV, international and internet rights of the LBA. Eurosport has TV rights also for Supercoppa and Coppa Italia.

All matches are broadcast live on internet pay TV service.

Current clubs

Venues and locations

Source:

List of champions

Source:

  1920: Costanza
  1921: Assi Milano
  1922: Assi Milano
  1923: Internazionale Milano
  1924: Assi Milano
  1925: Assi Milano
  1926: Assi Milano
  1927: Assi Milano
  1928: Ginnastica Roma
  1929: Not held
  1930: Ginnastica Triestina
  1931: Ginnastica Roma
  1932: Ginnastica Triestina
  1933: Ginnastica Roma
  1934: Ginnastica Triestina
  1935: Ginnastica Roma
 1935–36: Borletti Milano 
 1936–37: Borletti Milano 
 1937–38: Borletti Milano 
 1938–39: Borletti Milano 
 1939–40: Ginnastica Triestina 
 1940–41: Ginnastica Triestina
 1941–42: Reyer Venezia
 1942–43: Reyer Venezia 
 1943–44: Not held due to WWII
 1944–45: Not held due to WWII
 1945–46: Virtus Bologna 
 1946–47: Virtus Bologna 
 1947–48: Virtus Bologna
 1948–49: Virtus Bologna 
 1949–50: Borletti Milano 
 1950–51: Borletti Milano 
 1951–52: Borletti Milano 
 1952–53: Borletti Milano 
 1953–54: Borletti Milano 
 1954–55: Minganti Bologna 
 1955–56: Minganti Bologna 
 1956–57: Simmenthal Milano 
 1957–58: Simmenthal Milano 
 1958–59: Simmenthal Milano 
 1959–60: Simmenthal Milano
 1960–61: Ignis Varese
 1961–62: Simmenthal Milano 
 1962–63: Simmenthal Milano 
 1963–64: Ignis Varese 
 1964–65: Simmenthal Milano 
 1965–66: Simmenthal Milano  
 1966–67: Simmenthal Milano  
 1967–68: Oransoda Cantù 
 1968–69: Ignis Varese 
 1969–70: Ignis Varese
 1970–71: Ignis Varese 
 1971–72: Simmenthal Milano 
 1972–73: Ignis Varese  
 1973–74: Ignis Varese 
 1974–75: Birra Forst Cantù 
 1975–76: Sinudyne Bologna 
 1976–77: Mobilgirgi Varese 
 1977–78: Mobilgirgi Varese 
 1978–79: Sinudyne Bologna 
 1979–80: Sinudyne Bologna 
 1980–81: Squibb Cantù 
 1981–82: Billy Milano 
 1982–83: Banco di Roma 
 1983–84: Granarolo Bologna 
 1984–85: Simac Milano 
 1985–86: Simac Milano
 1986–87: Tracer Milano 
 1987–88: Scavolini Pesaro
 1988–89: Philips Milano
 1989–90: Scavolini Pesaro 
 1990–91: Phonola Caserta 
 1991–92: Benetton Treviso 
 1992–93: Knorr Bologna 
 1993–94: Buckler Beer Bologna 
 1994–95: Buckler Beer Bologna 
 1995–96: Stefanel Milano 
 1996–97: Benetton Treviso 
 1997–98: Kinder Bologna 
 1998–99: Varese Roosters 
 1999–00: Paf Wennington Bologna 
 2000–01: Kinder Bologna  
 2001–02: Benetton Treviso 
 2002–03: Benetton Treviso 
 2003–04: Montepaschi Siena 
 2004–05: Climamio Bologna
 2005–06: Benetton Treviso 
 2006–07: Montepaschi Siena 
 2007–08: Montepaschi Siena 
 2008–09: Montepaschi Siena 
 2009–10: Montepaschi Siena 
 2010–11: Montepaschi Siena 
 2011–12:  Montepaschi Siena (Revoked) 
 2012–13:  Montepaschi Siena (Revoked) 
 2013–14: EA7 Emporio Armani Milano
 2014–15: Banco di Sardegna Sassari
 2015–16: EA7 Emporio Armani Milano
 2016–17: Umana Reyer Venezia
 2017–18: EA7 Emporio Armani Milano
 2018–19: Umana Reyer Venezia
 2019–20: Cancelled due to COVID-19
 2020–21: Virtus Segafredo Bologna
 2021–22: AX Armani Exchange Milano

Performance by club

Bold indicates clubs which will play in the 2020–21 LBA season.

Italian basketball clubs in European and worldwide competitions

Individual awards 

LBA Most Valuable Player Award
LBA Finals Valuable Player Award
LBA Best Player Under 22
LBA Best Coach
LBA Best Executive
LBA Best Defender

Statistical leaders

Lega Basket All Star Game

References

External links
 Italy Lega Serie A at Basketball-Reference.com
 Serie A page at Eurobasket
Lega A fixtures, results and standings at sportstats
Official Website 

 

 
Basketball leagues in Italy
Basketball leagues in Europe
Sports leagues established in 1920
1920 establishments in Italy
Professional sports leagues in Italy